Paw Paw is a town in Morgan County, West Virginia, United States. The population was 410 at the 2020 census. The town is known for the nearby Paw Paw Tunnel. Paw Paw was incorporated by the Circuit Court of Morgan County on April 8, 1891, and named for the pawpaw,  a wild fruit that grows in abundance throughout this region. Paw Paw is the westernmost incorporated community in Morgan County, and the Hagerstown-Martinsburg, MD-WV Metropolitan Statistical Area.

Paw Paw is located along the section of the Potomac River known as the Paw Paw Bends. The Paw Paw Valley is surrounded by the ridges of Sideling Hill, Green Ridge, Purslane Mountain and Town Hill.

The town is the namesake of the Paw Paw Tunnel which was part of the Chesapeake and Ohio Canal. Construction of the tunnel began in 1836 and was completed in 1850, 12 years behind schedule. Today, the tunnel and nearby canal are part of the Chesapeake and Ohio Canal National Historical Park.

Geography
Paw Paw is located at  (39.531140, -78.456920).

History 

The earliest human habitation in the upper Potomac River Valley probably dates from 10,000 BC when humans migrated across the Bering Straits into North America. In the 17th century, Europeans began arriving in increasing numbers. As European settlements gradually spread across western Virginia, the tribes were pushed from their villages and fields, which were then claimed and cultivated by the new settlers.

In 1681, England’s King Charles II made the first land grants in what is now the Eastern Panhandle of West Virginia. The territory, which includes Morgan County, was eventually inherited by Thomas, sixth Lord Fairfax and became known as the Fairfax Land Grant. In 1746, Thomas Jefferson’s father Peter was part of the survey party that reached the source of the Potomac River and set down the landmark known as the Fairfax Stone, now part of the Fairfax Stone Historical Monument State Park.

The following year, George Washington surveyed the region and later purchased land on the Paw Paw Bends, so named because of the way the Potomac River twists and turns for 31 miles between the towns of Paw Paw and Little Orleans. Washington described the land as being “In the shape of a horseshoe, the river running almost around it—two hundred acres of rich low grounds with a great abundance of walnut trees.”

By 1749, the Potomac River near present-day Paw Paw was being navigated by fur traders of the Ohio Company, while settlers were establishing farms on the surrounding land.

In 1836, the C&O Canal Company began work on a tunnel that was designed to eliminate seven miles of navigation on the river near Paw Paw. Two years later, construction of the Baltimore and Ohio Railroad began. Because of its proximity to both the railroad and the river, Paw Paw was considered a place of strategic importance during the American Civil War and was occupied by some 16,000 Union troops, most whom were quartered at Camp Chase (now Camp Hill), located east of Paw Paw, under the command of Brigadier General Frederick W. Lander.

In 1868, J.B. Hoyt and Company of New York established a leather factory in Paw Paw, which provided hundreds of jobs until its closure in 1951. 
Paw Paw also became well-known for its local orchards and fruit packing houses. The Morgan News reported in 1894 "Paw Paw at the present time is more beautiful than in any former time of her history. The streets are superb, plank pavements elegant and her street lights refulgent." The streets were lit by oil lamps until 1926 when the Paw Paw Electric Company was awarded the franchise to bring electricity to the town. The first public school in Paw Paw started in the early 1870s in a building erected on the grounds of the tannery, but was washed away in the flood of 1877.

Transportation

The C&O Canal and the B&O Railroad both played important roles in the town's growth and prosperity. 
The Potomac River was dangerous and difficult to navigate, and the charter to build a canal to create a trade route with western settlements in Ohio and beyond was granted on May 17, 1785, to the Potowmack Company whose investors included George Washington.  Three decades later, more than $729,000 had been spent on the project, but navigation on the river was still limited to only 45 days a year. The charter was taken over by the newly formed C&O Canal Company in 1828.

Construction on the Paw Paw Tunnel began in 1836 with a workforce composed largely of English, Welsh, German and Irish laborers. Plagued by accidents, disease, worker riots, and financial woes, the tunnel finally opened in 1850. Six million bricks were used in its construction which required cutting through 3,118 feet through stratified shale with hand tools and black powder charges. A strike in 1922, a flood in 1924, and the decline in demand for coal, which was a major source of freight revenue for the canal, after World War I led to its closure in 1925.

The B&O Railroad began construction after the C&O Canal but reached Cumberland, Maryland, in 1842, eight years ahead of the canal. 
Railroad construction started in Paw Paw in 1838, and over the next half century, the town became an important focal point for trade, bringing jobs and prosperity to the region. In 1905, the Western Maryland Railroad was constructed north of Paw, and in 1914, the B&O built a shortline through Paw Paw, with six local stops each day. The B&O removed the main line track from Paw Paw in 1961, bringing regular passenger service in Paw Paw to an end. The Paw Paw railroad depot, which had opened in 1845 was permanently closed in 1961.

In 1928, the first bridge was built over the Potomac River from Paw Paw into Maryland, enabling the completion of a road directly into Cumberland. Previously, a ferry was used to cross the river.

Today, the primary highway into Paw Paw is West Virginia Route 9. WV 9 heads eastward to Berkeley Springs, the county seat, where it connects with U.S. Route 522. WV 9 also continues eastward from Berkeley Springs to Martinsburg. To the west, WV 9 crosses the Potomac River into Allegany County, Maryland, where it becomes Maryland Route 51. MD 51 continues westward to Cumberland, ending at a junction with Interstate 68, U.S. Route 40 and U.S. Route 220.

Demographics

2010 census
As of the census of 2010, there were 508 people, 223 households, and 131 families living in the town. The racial makeup of the town was 92.9% White, 2.4% African American, 2.0% Native American, 0.4% Asian, 0.4% from other races, and 2.0% from two or more races. Hispanic or Latino of any race were 2.6% of the population.

There were 223 households, of which 30.0% had children under the age of 18 living with them, 41.3% were married couples living together, 12.6% had a female householder with no husband present, 4.9% had a male householder with no wife present, and 41.3% were non-families. 37.7% of all households were made up of individuals, and 19.7% had someone living alone who was 65 years of age or older. The average household size was 2.28 and the average family size was 2.96.

The median age in the town was 38.6 years. 23.6% of residents were under the age of 18; 7.5% were between the ages of 18 and 24; 27.6% were from 25 to 44; 25% were from 45 to 64; and 16.3% were 65 years of age or older. The gender makeup of the town was 49.0% male and 51.0% female.

2000 census
As of the census of 2000, there were 524 people, 224 households, and 144 families living in the town. The racial makeup of the town was 89.50% White, 7.63% African American, 2.29% from other races, and 0.57% from two or more races. Hispanic or Latino of any race were 3.44% of the population.

There were 224 households, out of which 27.7% had children under the age of 18 living with them, 43.8% were married couples living together, 14.7% had a female householder with no husband present, and 35.3% were non-families. 28.6% of all households were made up of individuals, and 17.4% had someone living alone who was 65 years of age or older. The average household size was 2.32 and the average family size was 2.87.

In the town, the population was spread out, with 22.5% under the age of 18, 10.1% from 18 to 24, 25.2% from 25 to 44, 23.3% from 45 to 64, and 18.9% who were 65 years of age or older. The median age was 40 years. For every 100 females, there were 90.5 males. For every 100 females age 18 and over, there were 82.9 males.

The median income for a household in the town was $25,625, and the median income for a family was $30,250. Males had a median income of $27,500 versus $23,125 for females. The per capita income for the town was $17,377. About 14.9% of families and 18.1% of the population were below the poverty line, including 25.7% of those under age 18 and 14.0% of those age 65 or over.

Notable people 

Paul "Oz" Bach, founder and bass player for the popular musical group Spanky and Our Gang, was born in Paw Paw on June 24, 1939.

The Texas swing band Asleep at the Wheel got its start in Paw Paw, according to founder Ray Benson.

References

External links

 Paw Paw on the Washington Heritage Trail
 Official Site

Towns in Morgan County, West Virginia
Towns in West Virginia
Baltimore and Ohio Railroad
Populated places in the Cumberland, MD-WV MSA
West Virginia populated places on the Potomac River